Walter Mart (stylized as WalterMart) is a Filipino chain of community shopping malls located in Metro Manila, Central, and South Luzon. The chain operates its anchor stores that include Walter Mart Supermarket, Walter Mart Cinemas, Abenson Appliances, Abenson Home Furniture, Electroworld, and SB Furnitures. Filipino retail stores such as Watsons, Ace Hardware, and W Department Store are also occupying most of Walter Mart's branches.

Walter Mart's corporate headquarters are located in North EDSA, Quezon City.

History

Walter Mart was founded in the 1990s by Wilson Lim, at the time of the economic crisis when the major players were not expanding aggressively. The company saw that there was an opportunity to expand in developing communities and uplift their standards of living by providing gainful employment to the locals and improving their shopping experience.

In January 2013, SM Retail and SM Prime Holdings, Inc. entered into a joint venture agreement with Walter Mart to co-manage the operations of WM-branded community-based malls located in the provinces of Central Luzon, Southern Tagalog and cities in Metro Manila.

In February 2016, the SM-Waltermart group rescinded an earlier deal to jointly develop shopping malls with 8990 Holdings as these may take business away from SM's shopping centers.

Walter Mart Supermarket
Walter Mart Supermarket is located within most Walter Mart malls. The first supermarket started in E. Rodriguez, Quezon City. In 1995, the owners entered into a partnership with International Grocers Alliance (IGA), making it the only supermarket chain in the Philippines to become a member of the organization. Currently, it is now one of the youngest and fastest-growing supermarket chains in the Philippines with 28 more locations in Metro Manila, Central, and South Luzon.

W.Mall
W.Mall is a community mall of Walter Mart that opened its first branch at Macapagal Boulevard corner Coral Way, Pasay on April 26, 2018. The mall anchors Walter Mart Supermarket, Miniso, Kidzoona, Abenson Home, and SB Furnitures.

The second branch of W.Mall is located at Km. 21 West Service Road in Sucat, Muntinlupa. It opened on September 21, 2022.

Abenson Office Building
The proposed 12-story Abenson office building beside Walter Mart's corporate office is nearing completion - construction started at the height of the COVID-19 pandemic in 2020.

Gallery

References

External links

Companies based in Quezon City
Shopping center management firms
Retail companies of the Philippines
Real estate companies established in 1990
Retail companies established in 1990
Supermarkets of the Philippines
Shopping malls in the Philippines
Philippine brands